General elections were held in Suriname on 25 November 1987, the first for over ten years. The result was a victory for the Front for Democracy and Development (an alliance of the National Party of Suriname, the Progressive Reform Party and the Party for National Unity and Solidarity), which won 40 of the 51 seats. Voter turnout was 85%.

Results

Notes

References

Suriname
Elections in Suriname
1987 in Suriname